Sameway Magazine is a Chinese-language fortnightly tabloid-format newspaper published in Melbourne in Victoria (Australia).

It was first published as a magazine in September 2004, and is currently printed fortnightly in three editions.
Different editions are available in Adelaide, Melbourne and Sydney/Brisbane. An insert is included under the name of Sameway Magazine Leisure.
, the newspaper had an audited circulation of 17,000 each week.

The majority of the magazine is in Traditional Chinese, with some articles and the editorial in English.

The magazine is also available online (ISSN 1839-7921) from issue #271.

History
Since inception Raymond Chow has been the editor.

The head office of Sameway Magazine has relocated from a former premises in Kingsway, Glen Waverley to a new office complex at Suite 7, 1F 2-8 Burwood Hwy, Burwood East, Victoria. In 2015 the head office again relocated to 67 Mahoneys Rd, Forest Hill, Victoria. At the end of 2019 the office again relocated to 1f/1 Walkers Rd, Nunawading, Victoria.

The format of Sameway Magazine has changed from glossy magazine cover and features to newsprint, and the tabloid size has been altered with change to new printing contractors.

Sameway Magazine was a publication of Rejoice Chinese Christian Communication Centre Inc. The publisher changed to Creative Every Day in 2012.

The Sydney/Brisbane and Adelaide editions were commenced with issue #100.

In 2019 Sameway Magazine changed from a weekly to a fortnightly publication.

See also 

 List of newspapers in Australia
 List of non-English-language newspapers in New South Wales

References

External links 
 Sameway Magazine
 Driveway Magazine – Sameway Magazine supplement
  (print)
  (online)

2004 establishments in Australia
Publications established in 2004
Magazines established in 2004
Chinese-Australian culture
Chinese-language magazines
Mass media in Adelaide
Mass media in Brisbane
Mass media in Melbourne
Biweekly magazines published in Australia
Non-English-language newspapers published in Australia
Overseas Chinese organisations

wuu:同路人 (杂志)
zh:同路人 (澳洲华人刊物)